Events in the year 1955 in Mexico.

Incumbents

Federal government
 President: Adolfo Ruiz Cortines
 Interior Secretary (SEGOB): Ángel Carvajal Bernal
 Secretary of Foreign Affairs (SRE): Luis Padilla Nervo
 Communications Secretary (SCT): Carlos Lazo
 Education Secretary (SEP): José Ángel Ceniceros
 Secretary of Defense (SEDENA): Matias Ramos
 Secretary of Navy: Rodolfo Sánchez Taboada/Roberto Gómez Maqueo
 Secretary of Labor and Social Welfare: Adolfo López Mateos

Supreme Court

 President of the Supreme Court: Vicente Santos Guajardo

Governors

 Aguascalientes: Benito Palomino Dena
 Baja California: Braulio Maldonado Sandez
 Campeche: Manuel López Hernández/Alberto Trueba Urbina
 Chiapas: Efraín Aranda Osorio
 Chihuahua: Oscar Soto Maynez/Jesús Lozoya Solís
 Coahuila: Ramón Cepeda López
 Colima: Jesús González Lugo/Rodolfo Chávez Carrillo
 Durango: Enrique Torres Sánchez
 Guanajuato: José Aguilar y Maya/J. Jesús Rodríguez Gaona
 Guerrero: Darío L. Arrieta Mateos
 Hidalgo: Quintín Rueda Villagrán
 Jalisco: Agustín Yáñez
 State of Mexico: Salvador Sánchez Colín
 Michoacán: Dámaso Cárdenas del Río
 Morelos: Rodolfo López de Nava
 Nayarit: José Limón Guzmán
 Nuevo León: José S. Vivanco/Raúl Rangel Frías
 Oaxaca: Manuel Cabrera Carrasqueado/Manuel I. Manjardín/José Pacheco Iturribarría
 Puebla: Rafael Ávila Camacho
 Querétaro: Octavio Mondragón Guerra/Juan C. Gorraéz
 San Luis Potosí: Ismael Salas Penieres/Manuel Álvarez
 Sinaloa: Rigoberto Aguilar Pico 
 Sonora: Ignacio Soto/Álvaro Obregón Tapia
 Tabasco: Manuel Bartlett Bautista/Miguel Orrico de los Llanos
 Tamaulipas: Horacio Terán
 Tlaxcala: Felipe Mazarraza	 
 Veracruz: Marco Antonio Muñoz Turnbull
 Yucatán: Víctor Mena Palomo
 Zacatecas: José Minero Roque
Regent of the Federal District: Ernesto P. Uruchurtu

Events

 The organization known as El Yunque was allegedly formed in this year.
 The Querétaro Intercontinental Airport is established.
 The Sonora Institute of Technology was founded as Justo Sierra Institute (Instituto Justo Sierra) 
 July 4: 1955 Mexican legislative election.
 September 10–20: Hurricane Hilda (1955).
 21–30: Hurricane Janet.
 December: Club de Yates de Acapulco opens its doors.

Awards
Belisario Domínguez Medal of Honor – Erasmo Castellanos Quinto

Film

 List of Mexican films of 1955

Sport

 1954–55 Mexican Primera División season.
 The 1955 Pan American Games take place in Mexico City. 
 The Tigres del México win the Mexican League.

Births
January 19 – Paul Rodriguez, Mexican-American comedian and actor
January 26 – Lucía Méndez, soap opera actress, model, and singer
 May 11 – María Sorté, actress and singer
May 22 – Francisco Vega de Lamadrid, Governor of Baja California 2013-2019
May 25 – Andrés Mora, baseball player (Baltimore Orioles, Cleveland Indians, Mexican Professional Baseball Hall of Fame), (d. June 12, 2015).
 June 2 – Miguel Ángel Gutiérrez Ávila, anthropologist (d. 2008)
July 26 – Rogelio Ortega Martínez, educator and interim Governor of Guerrero 2014–2015
August 14 – Carlos Medina Plascencia, educator and Governor of Guanajuato 1991 – 1995
September 21  – Rogelio Padilla, sociologist, activist for children's rights, founder of MAMA, A.C. (d. 2018)
October 15 – Francisco Daniel Rivera Sánchez, auxiliary bishop of the Roman Catholic Archdiocese of Mexico City (2000-2021); d. January 18, 2021
December 10 – Juan Carlos Romero Hicks, Governor of Guanajuato 2000-2006
December 18 – Juan Molinar Horcasitas, politician (PAN), (d. May 20, 2015).
December 28 – Enrique Moreno, Mexican-American lawyer (d 2019).

Deaths
 July 9 – Adolfo de la Huerta, 38th President of Mexico (b. 1881)
 October 13 – Manuel Ávila Camacho, 45th President of Mexico (b. 1897)

References